Kadidja Mohamed Ali is a Djiboutian politician. In 2003 she was elected to the National Assembly as one of the first women to enter the legislature.

Career
Prior to the 2003 elections, a new electoral law was passed that required at least 10% of party lists to consist of each gender. Ali was elected in Djibouti Region as a representative of the Union for the Presidential Majority. She was one of seven successful female candidates who became the first women in the National Assembly.

References

Date of birth unknown
Living people
Djiboutian women in politics
Members of the National Assembly (Djibouti)
Year of birth missing (living people)